Valeriy Chaly may refer to:

 Valeriy Chaly (diplomat) (born 1970), Ukrainian diplomat
 Valeriy Chaly (footballer) (born 1958), Ukrainian-Russian football coach and former player